"Tonight I'm Gonna Let Go" is a song by American singer Syleena Johnson. It was written by Johnson, Mike Dunn, and James Seals for her third studio album Chapter 2: The Voice (2002), while production was helmed by Dunn. The song was released as the album's lead single in 2002 and became a top 40 hit in United Kingdom.

Music video
A music video for the R. Kelly-produced Remix of "Tonight I'm Gonna Let Go" was directed by filmmaker Nzingha Stewart. It features appearances Busta Rhymes and fellow Flipmode Squad members Sham, Rampage, and Spliff Star.

Track listing

Notes
 denotes remix producer

Credits and personnel 
Credits adapted from the Chapter 2: The Voice liner notes.

Mike Dunn – producer, writer
Syleena Johnson – writer
James Seals – writer

Brian Stanley – recording engineer
Chris Trevett – recording engineer

Charts

Release history

References

Syleena Johnson songs
2001 singles
Jive Records singles
2001 songs
Songs written by James Seals